Andrew Hedtler "Andy" Fairfield (May 31, 1943 – February 16, 2020) was an American Anglican bishop.

He was a theological conservative. He served from 1989 to 2003 as the tenth bishop of the Episcopal Diocese of North Dakota in the Episcopal Church.

In a 1996, Bishop Fairfield was the dissent in a 7-to-1 decision to dismiss heresy charges against retired bishop Walter C. Righter.

In 2008, he renounced his ordained ministry in the Episcopal Church. After his retirement, in disagreement with the pro-homosexuality policies of his church, he was translated to the Anglican Church of Uganda, in 2007, and subsequently to the Anglican Church in North America. Until his death, he was assisting bishop in the Anglican Diocese in New England.

See also
 Anglican realignment

References

People from Northampton, Massachusetts
20th-century Anglican bishops in the United States
Bishops of the Anglican Church in North America
1943 births
2020 deaths
Episcopal bishops of North Dakota
21st-century American clergy